Baton Bunny is a 1959 Warner Bros. Looney Tunes cartoon, directed by Chuck Jones and Abe Levitow. The short was released on 10 January 1959, and stars Bugs Bunny.

It shows Bugs conducting an orchestra – with a fly bothering him. Bugs conducts, and in part, plays the overture to "Ein Morgen, ein Mittag und Abend in Wien" (A Morning, Noon, and Night in Vienna)", a composition by Franz von Suppé. Though Mel Blanc was credited for vocal characterizations, there is no dialogue in the short; the only vocal effect made was when an audience member is heard coughing. This is the third and last Bugs Bunny cartoon (the first two being A Corny Concerto and Rhapsody Rabbit, although he says three lines in the latter) where Bugs is silent. Or, nearly silent; at one point, he 'shushes' the brass. This is also one of the last cartoons to get a Merrie Melodies Blue Ribbon reissue in 1968.

Plot
Bugs is about to conduct "The Warner Bros. Symphony Orchestra" (supposedly in concert at the Hollywood Bowl).  As he begins his elaborate preparation, someone in the audience starts coughing loudly. Bugs holds up a sign reading, "Throw the bum out!", which the audience does. Other problems plague Bugs' conducting, notably a bothersome fly and awkward cuffs that keep falling off; with each of these issues, his reactions act as direction to the orchestra, which responds accordingly, angering Bugs. In the middle of the performance, as a result of the music at that moment, Bugs plays dual roles as an indigenous person and the American troops chasing him. As his performance ends, the fly returns, landing on Bugs' nose. Bugs loses his sanity and attempts to kill the fly, crashing through the orchestra and into the instruments as he does so. As the music ends and the fly seems to be dead, Bugs bows to the crowd. Instead of applause, there is only silence and crickets chirping. Bugs looks around and sees that the seats are empty, then he becomes aware of faint clapping – coming from the fly. He bows to the fly, and the cartoon ends.

Home media
The short was released on DVD on the Looney Tunes Golden Collection: Volume 1 in 2003.

See also
Looney Tunes and Merrie Melodies filmography (1950–59)
List of Bugs Bunny cartoons
 Rhapsody Rabbit, a similar 1946 short where Bugs Bunny plays Hungarian Rhapsody No. 2 while fending off a mouse

References

External links

1959 films
1959 animated films
1959 short films
Films directed by Abe Levitow
Short films directed by Chuck Jones
Looney Tunes shorts
Warner Bros. Cartoons animated short films
Bugs Bunny films
Films set in Los Angeles
Animated films without speech
Animated films about insects
American musical comedy films
1959 musical comedy films
Films scored by Milt Franklyn
Animated films about music and musicians
1950s Warner Bros. animated short films
Films with screenplays by Michael Maltese
Films about flies